Kol Zimrah is an independent minyan or chavurah founded in 2002, based in New York City and meeting primarily on Manhattan's Upper West Side.  Its motto is "meaningful prayer through music".

The congregation meets regularly for Friday night services which combine Hebrew language liturgy with musical instruments and singing. It does not identify itself with any of the established Jewish religious movements, and has a style of prayer that does not fit neatly into the styles associated with any of them.

Like other chavurot, Kol Zimrah has no rabbi or other professional leadership, and is run completely by volunteers.  It uses a "two-table" system at its potluck dinners (one table with vegetarian food, and one table with vegetarian food in which all ingredients have kashrut certification) in order to accommodate different standards of kashrut in a pluralistic community.

Kol Zimrah has a "sibling" relationship with Tikkun Leil Shabbat in Washington, D.C., one of the few other congregations that has services in the same style (musical instruments and the traditional structure of the liturgy).

References

External links
 
 

Independent minyanim
Synagogues in Manhattan
Unaffiliated synagogues in New York City
Upper West Side
Jewish organizations established in 2002
2002 establishments in New York City